The following lists events that happened during 1992 in Cape Verde.

Incumbents
President: António Mascarenhas Monteiro
Prime Minister: Carlos Veiga

Events
The municipalities of São Filipe and Mosteiros were formed from the former municipality of Fogo
Cape Verde ratified the UN treaties of Convention against Torture and Other Cruel, Inhuman or Degrading Treatment or Punishment and the Convention on the Rights of the Child
IMPAR, an insurance company, established in Praia
October 2: CFPES dissolved, ISE (Instituto Superior de Educação) established, now part of the University of Cape Verde

Arts and entertainment
March/April: the first edition of Festival de Gamboa took place on the beach in Praia
November 15: Cesária Évora's album Mar Azul released

Sports
CS Mindelense won the Cape Verdean Football Championship

Births
January 10: Mailó, footballer
March 22: Walter Tavares, basketball player
March 25: Nuno Rocha, footballer
July 24: Armando Freitas, footballer

References

 
Years of the 20th century in Cape Verde
1980s in Cape Verde
Cape Verde
Cape Verde